The 2012 Japanese Regional Leagues were a competition between parallel association football leagues ranking at the bottom of the Japan Football League.

Champions list

League standings

Hokkaido

Tohoku

Division 1

Division 2 North

Division 2 South

Kanto

Division 1

Division 2

Hokushinetsu

Division 1

Division 2

Tokai

Division 1

Division 2

Kansai

Division 1

Division 2

Chugoku

Shikoku

Kyushu

2012
4